A. C. Smith may refer to:

 Albert C. Smith (disambiguation), several individuals:
 Albert C. Smith (United States Army officer) (1894–1974), officer in the United States Army
 Albert Charles Smith (1906–1999), American botanist
 Alan Smith (cricketer) (born 1936), English former Test cricketer
 A. C. Smith & Co. Gas Station, a historic gas station in Quincy, Massachusetts

See also
 C. A. Smith (born 1895), British politician
 A. C. H. Smith (born 1935 as A. C. Smith), British novelist and playwright